Prin (Greek: Πριν, meaning "Before") is a weekly newspaper, published in Athens and circulating nationwide. Prin is published by the New Left Current, although it is not strictly the newspaper of the party.

History
Prin started as a monthly magazine, published by members of the Communist Party of Greece. Shortly after the secession of several members of the Central Committee, that led to the foundation of the New Left Current, Prin was transformed into a weekly newspaper on 18 March 1990.

Content
Prin is organised in several sections as following:
Politics: Includes permanent columns and commentary on the current political situation
Iconoclasts: A two-page analysis of a political, economic or ideological issue
Prinidon: Small comments of the political situation
Opinions: Articles of associates plus analysis of the Political line of the New Left Current 
The other side: A two-page article on a historic or ideological issue.
Τimeliness: Announcement of political events plus a permanent column of socioeconomic commentary.
Interview: An interview of a political figure, most commonly not associated with the New Left Current
Society: Articles on social issues
Workers: News of trade unions most commonly elections, strikes and demonstrations.
Ideas: Articles of independent left militants or other political organisations.
Culture
International

Motto
Newspaper of the Independent Left

See also
 New Left Current
 Anticapitalist Left Cooperation for the Overthrow

References

Newspapers published in Athens
Greek-language newspapers
Socialist newspapers
Weekly newspapers published in Greece